Sea Base may be:

 Florida National High Adventure Sea Base
 Long Beach Sea Base
 Newport Sea Base
 Pardee Scout Sea Base
 Stockton Sea Scout Base